The Stains were an American punk band from Portland, Maine, United States, started in 1979 and lasted until Feb. 1983, and were led by guitarist George Ripley and vocalist Dave Buxton, Beth Blood and Ira Nulton on bass as well as Joe Potter on drums. Lead guitarists in the studio and in live performance included Dave Morton, Steve Soma, Marc English, Gary Gogel, and Roger Miller. The Stains released a 7" EP on Gutterworst Records with the songs "Feel Guilty" and "Give Ireland Back To The Snakes" on one side, and "Sick Of Being Sick" and "Submission" on the other. A posthumous album was released on the same label in 1989, featuring 15 more songs recorded between 1979 and 1983. Ripley and Potter along with Beth Blood moved on to form a garage rock band called GHOST WALKS.

The Portland Stains are often mistaken as being from Boston, perhaps because they moved to Boston in 1981, and possibly because of some confusion with Steve Stain; a Boston-area punk performance artist who often borrowed musicians from various Boston rock bands, to back him up when he was performing. Sometimes he billed his impromptu band as "The Stains".

References

Stains, The
Musical groups from Portland, Maine
Rock music groups from Maine